The Chroococcales are an order of cyanobacteria in some classifications which includes the harmful algal bloom Microcystis aeruginosa. Molecular data indicate that Chroococcales may be polyphyletic, meaning its members may not all belong to the same clade or have the same common ancestor.

Characteristics
The order is characterized by single, floating cells or colonies which are embedded to a matrix. Also, a lack of differentiation between apical and basal structures exists.

References

 
Bacteria orders